Jeotgal or jeot, translated as salted seafood, is a category of salted preserved dishes made with seafood such as shrimps, oysters, clams, fish, and roe. Depending on the ingredients, jeotgal can range from flabby, solid pieces to clear, broth-like liquid. 

Solid jeotgal are usually eaten as banchan (side dishes). Liquid jeotgal, called aekjeot or fish sauce, is popularly used in kimchi seasoning, as well as in various soups and stews (guk, jijimi, jjigae). As a condiment, jeotgal with smaller bits of solid ingredients such as saeu-jeot (shrimp jeotgal) is commonly served as a dipping sauce with pork dishes (bossam, jokbal, samgyeopsal), sundae (Korean sausage), hoe (raw fish), and a number of soups and stews.

History
Fermented foods were widely available in Three Kingdoms of Korea, as Sānguózhì, a Jin Chinese historical text published in 289, mentions that the Goguryeo Koreans are skilled in making fermented foods such as wine, soybean paste and salted and fermented fish in the section titled Dongyi in the Book of Wei. The first Korean record of jeotgal appeared in Samguk Sagi, with a reference that King Sinmun offered rice, wine, jerky, and jeotgal as wedding presents in 683. In 1124, a Song Chinese envoy wrote that jeotgal was enjoyed by high and low alike in Goryeo. Twenty-four types of jeotgal appear in Miam ilgi(眉巖日記), a 16th-century diary written by a 16th century Joseon literatus Ryu hui chun, and over 180 types of jeotgal can be found in the coeval books Gosa chwaryo(고사촬요,攷事撮要) and Swaemirok(쇄미록,瑣尾錄), and in 17‒18th century books Eumsik dimibang, Sallim gyeongje, and Jeungbo sallim gyeongje.

Types
The types of jeotgal vary depending on main ingredients, regions, and family and personal preferences. In past times, due to the limited availability of transportation, regions near seas had more types of jeot compared to the inland areas.

Fish (fish innards and roe)

Shellfish and other marine animals

Gallery

See also

References

 
Korean seafood